The 1st Cavalry Division (1-ya Kavaleriiskaya Diviziya) was a cavalry formation of the Russian Imperial Army.

Organization
1st Cavalry Brigade
1st Leib-Dragoons of Moscow Regiment
1st Leib-Uhlan of St. Petersburg Regiment
2nd Cavalry Brigade
1st Regiment of Hussars of Sumy
1st Don Regiment of Cossacks
1st Horse Artillery Divizion (1st and 2nd Batteries)

Commanders
1885–1888: Kazimir Vasilevich Levitsky
1899–1901: Sergei Vasilchikov

Commanders of the 1st Brigade
1884–1891: Alexander Kaulbars

References

Cavalry divisions of the Russian Empire
Military units and formations disestablished in 1918